The 1954 Trinity Tigers football team was an American football team that represented Trinity University in San Antonio as a member of the Gulf Coast Conference (GCC) during the 1954 college football season. Led by third-year head coach William A. McElreath, the Tigers compiled an overall record of 9–0 with a mark of 2–0 in conference play, winning the GCC title.

Schedule

References

Trinity
Trinity Tigers football seasons
College football undefeated seasons
Trinity Tigers football